Bond v. United States, 572 U.S. 844 (2014), follows up on the Supreme Court's 2011 case of the same name in which it had reversed the Third Circuit and concluded that both individuals and states can bring a Tenth Amendment challenge to federal law. The case was remanded to the Third Circuit, for a decision on the merits, which again ruled against Bond. On appeal, the Supreme Court reversed and remanded again, ruling that the Chemical Weapons Convention Implementation Act of 1998 did not reach Bond's actions and she could not be charged under that federal law.

Background 
Carol Anne Bond is a microbiologist from Lansdale, Pennsylvania. In 2006, her best friend became pregnant. When Bond discovered that her husband was the child's father, she attempted to poison her former friend by putting organoarsenic and potassium dichromate on the woman's door knob. Bond was caught, and was convicted under the CWA. In her appeal, she argued that applying the chemical weapons treaty to her had violated the Tenth Amendment. The Court of Appeals ruled that Bond lacked standing to make a Tenth Amendment claim. On appeal, the Supreme Court reversed by stating that individuals can bring Tenth Amendment claims. The Court then remanded the case for the Third Circuit to decide the case on the merits.

On remand, the Third Circuit found that "because the Convention is an international agreement with a subject matter that lies at the core of the Treaty Power and because Holland instructs that 'there can be no dispute about the validity of [a] statute' that implements a valid treaty, we will affirm Bond's conviction." Bond again appealed to the Supreme Court, asking the court to overrule Holland or to find that her actions were not covered by the CWA.

The case attracted a great deal of attention, with US Solicitor General Donald Verrilli arguing for the government and former Solicitor General Paul Clement arguing for Bond. Senator Ted Cruz wrote an essay for the blog of the Harvard Law Review, urging the Court to overturn Bond's conviction.

Decision 

In its judgment, the Court unanimously concluded that the convention was not meant to cover local activities such as Bond's poisoning attempt. Writing for the Court, Chief Justice Roberts declined to define the scope of Treaty Clause powers, invoking constitutional avoidance. Because the Chemical Weapons Convention is not self-executing and because it requires implementation by a signatory to be "in accordance with its constitutional processes," Roberts focused his attention on statutory interpretation of the federal criminal code.

According to Roberts, one of the key "background principles of construction" is federalism; there must be a "clear indication" by Congress if it intends to "dramatically intrude upon traditional state criminal jurisdiction." The Court concluded that there was no such clear indication in the text of the criminal statute.

Roberts rejected the Solicitor General's interpretation of the statute, noting that the government's reading would make it a federal offense to poison children's goldfish and that state authorities are fully capable of punishing burrito poisoners.

Finally, Roberts briefly responds to Justice Scalia's interpretation by noting that adopting "the most sweeping reading of the statute would fundamentally upset the Constitution's balance."

A well-known line from his opinion is at the end: "The global need to prevent chemical warfare does not require the Federal Government to reach into the kitchen cupboard, or to treat a local assault with a chemical irritant as the deployment of a chemical weapon."

Concurrences
Justice Scalia, joined by Justice Thomas and partly by Justice Alito, concurred only in the judgment. Scalia departed from the majority by first reading the text as clearly federalizing a purely-local crime and Scalia concluding that it is unconstitutional for Congress to federalize a purely-local crime.

Scalia discounted the Court's logic as "result-driven antitextualism [that] befogs what is evident." Constitutional avoidance, according to Scalia, does not require interpreting the statute constitutionally because he reads the text as "utterly clear." Because the "unavoidable meaning of the text" is different from the meaning adopted by the majority, Scalia then proceeded to the constitutional question.

Scalia considered the necessary and proper clause not to apply to implementing treaties. Therefore, a treaty can be implemented only by the other enumerated powers of Congress. That is directly contrary to longstanding precedent, but he argued that he could overrule that precedent because he considered the holding of Justice Oliver Wendell Holmes, Jr., in Missouri v. Holland (1920) to be unreasoned.

As a counterfactual, Scalia feared that by using unlimited treaty powers, Congress could enter into an anti-polygamy treaty and thereby ban polygamy.

Justice Thomas, joined by Justice Scalia and partly by Justice Alito, agreed with Scalia that the convention reached Bond and that Holland should be overruled. Rather than concluding that the implementation of the convention to be unconstitutional, Thomas instead argued that the treaty itself is unconstitutional. Because the scope of the treaty power cannot regulate "purely domestic affairs," Thomas argued that the US could not join a treaty banning domestic chemical weapons.

Seeking the founders' original understanding, Thomas began by reviewing international law publications from the 1600s. While noting that contemporary dictionaries disagreed with him, Thomas concluded that the founders understood treaties as governing only "international intercourse."

He then cited as support the 1796 floor speeches made by in the US Congress against the Jay Treaty.

Furthermore, an 1815 treaty could constitutionally pre-empt a South Carolina law authorizing the local kidnapping of free negroes because, according to Thomas, some of the sailors who were enslaved were British.

Thomas closed by acknowledging that his distinction " may not be obvious in all cases" but noted that although the parties to the case did not argue that chemical weapons bans are unconstitutional, he was sure that he would be able to apply his limits to the treaty power "soon enough."

Justice Alito agrees that the convention covered Bond's actions and that it exceeded the treaty-making power of Congress.

Reactions 

The New Republic viewed the concurring justices' approach as an isolationist attempt to pass the failed Bricker Amendment judicially. Cato's Supreme Court Review focused on Scalia's use of Cato's amicus brief.  The 43-page "Comment" by Heather K. Gerken on the case declared it "a trivial entry in the federalism canon."

Subsequent Events 

In 2014, on remand the U.S. District Court vacated the sentence on the chemical weapons charges and imposed an 18-month sentence on theft of mail charges.

See also 
Missouri v. Holland
Reid v. Covert
Medellín v. Texas

References

External links
 
 SCOTUSBlog summary of Court opinion

United States Supreme Court cases
United States Supreme Court cases of the Roberts Court
2014 in United States case law
United States Tenth Amendment case law
United States standing case law